Brian Roberts (born 1930, London) authored numerous historical and biographical works around prominent persons, places and themes shaping South African history.

Educated at St Mary's College, Twickenham, and at the University of London, he qualified as a sociologist and a teacher. It was as a teacher that he went to South Africa in 1959. He and his partner, biographer and historian Theo Aronson, became disenchanted with the political regime in South Africa in the late 1970s and moved to England in 1979.

Books
Roberts' books include:
Ladies on the Veld (1965)
Cecil Rhodes and the Princess (1969)
Churchills in Africa (1970)
The Diamond Magnates (1972)
The Zulu Kings (1974)
Kimberley, Turbulent City (1976)
Randolph, a study of Churchill's son (1984)
Cecil Rhodes, flawed Colossus (1988)

References

External links
 Kimberley, Turbulent City, Cape Town: David Philip & Kimberley Historical Society (1976). /. 413 pages.
 

English historians
Writers from London
Alumni of the University of London
1930 births
Living people
Date of birth missing (living people)
Kimberley, Northern Cape